Nazaré is a Portuguese town and municipality located in the Oeste region, in the historical province of Estremadura, and in the Leiria District. The municipality has a population of 14,889 in an area of 82.43 km2, while the town itself has around 10,000 inhabitants.

It is one of the most popular seaside resorts in the Silver Coast (Costa de Prata).

The town of Nazaré consists of three neighbourhoods: Praia (along the beach), Sítio (an old village, on top of a cliff) and Pederneira (another old village, on a hilltop). Praia and Sítio are linked by the Nazaré Funicular, a funicular railway.

The present mayor is Walter Chicharro, a member of the Socialist Party. The municipal holiday is on 8 September, as part of the Our Lady Of Nazaré Festival, a ten-day religious and secular celebration with processions, bullfights, fireworks, folk dancing and a fair.

Etymology 
The name Nazaré is the Portuguese version of Nazareth, the biblical city in the Holy Land.

History and legend 

The earliest settlements were in Pederneira and in Sítio, above the beach. They provided the inhabitants with refuge against raids by Viking and, later, French, English and Dutch pirates, that lasted until as late as the beginning of the 19th century. In fact, only in the 19th century, with the gradual end of maritime piracy, was possible for the people to start occupying the Praia which is today considered the town center.

According to the Legend of Nazaré, the town derives its name from a small wooden statue of the Virgin Mary, brought from Nazareth, Holy Land, to a monastery near the city of Mérida, Spain, by a monk in the 4th century. The statue was brought to its current location in 711 by another monk, Romano, accompanied by Roderic, the last Visigoth king of today's Portugal. After their arrival at the seaside they decided to become hermits. Romano lived and died in a small natural grotto, on top of a cliff above the sea. After his death and according to his wishes, the king buried him in the grotto. Roderic left the statue of the Black Madonna in the grotto on an altar.

The first church in Sítio was built over the grotto to commemorate a miraculous intervention in 1182 by the Virgin Mary, which saved the life of the 12th-century Portuguese knight Dom Fuas Roupinho (possibly a templar) while he was hunting deer one morning in a dense fog. The episode is usually referred to as the Legend of Nazaré. In memory of the miracle he had a chapel (Capela da Memória) built over the small grotto, where the miraculous statue had been placed by king Roderic. Beside the chapel, on a rocky outcrop 110 meters above the Atlantic, one can still see the mark made in the rock by one of the hooves of Dom Fuas' horse. This Church of Nazareth, high on the rocky outcrop over Pederneira Bay, was noted as a landmark in sailors' manuals.

In 1377, King Fernando I of Portugal founded a new, more spacious church, which was totally transformed between the 16th and 19th centuries. The Sanctuary of Our Lady of Nazaré is a rich baroque building, with splendid tiles on its interior. Behind and above the main altar, visitors can see and venerate the miraculous statue of Our Lady of Nazaré. The religious figures are crowned by 18th century diadems, presented to the church by King John VI. The sacred image is wrapped with a green cloak decorated with gold, gifted to the Virgin Mary by King John V. The main chapel is separated from the body of the church with an arcade made from pau-santo and a few pillars decorated with mosaics in 19th century Italian marble.

Economy 
The Nazarene coastline is among the most dangerous in the world with its high waves and local fishermen have braved them for centuries. The town’s reliance on the sea for food production and economic viability is a result of the unique climate that differs from the surrounding Mediterranean eco-zone where land-farming is more common. Fishing in Nazaré is an activity carried out entirely by the village men, leaving the women to run daily life and daily governance in the town. These distinctly gendered roles and adherence to rudimentary fishing practices are widely believed to be the primary reason the town has not yet developed into a modern industrial society.

Geography
The municipality of Nazaré borders the Atlantic to the west and is surrounded entirely by the municipality of Alcobaça to the north, east and south.

Climate

Nazaré has a Mediterranean climate (Köppen: Csb) with warm, dry summers and mild, wet winters. The town's climate is moderated by the Atlantic Ocean and the seasonal upwelling phenomena typical of western Portugal gives it cool to warm, dry and overall sunny summers. As a result of the marine layer, morning and evening fogs are very frequent in the summer and can persist all day on rare occasions. The seasonal downwelling on the other hand is most common in the winter and gives Nazaré a more unstable, Atlantic dominated weather with often overcast, rainy and stormy days, clear days, however, are not uncommon in this season. Temperatures above  or below  are very uncommon.  Nazaré also experiences some seasonal lag, with temperatures in September being warmer than those in June.

Human geography
Administratively, the municipality is divided into 3 civil parishes (freguesias):
 Famalicão
 Nazaré
 Valado dos Frades

Culture

Tourism

Over the 20th century, Nazaré progressively evolved from a fishing village to a point of interest among Portuguese and International tourists, advertising itself internationally as a picturesque seaside village.

Located on the Atlantic coast, it has long sandy beaches (considered by some to be among the best in Portugal), attracting many tourists in the summer. The town used to be known for the traditional costumes worn by the fishermen. Women traditionally wear a headscarf and embroidered apron over seven flannel skirts in different colours. The costumes are still worn occasionally.

It is quite visited due to the religious festivals dedicated to Our Lady of Nazaré, in which there are processions and also some profane celebrations.

Many of the tourists and Catholic pilgrims who visit Central Portugal, and especially the internationally famous Sanctuary of Our Lady of Fátima (located nearby in Cova da Iria), go to Nazaré for a visit or to watch the surfing championships.

Museums and cultural centers
 Doctor Joaquim Manso Folk and Archeological Museum
 Sacred Art Museum of Reitor Luís Nesi
 Fisherman House-Museum
 Nazaré Bullring
 Nazaré Cultural Centre

Surfing

Nazaré is a very popular surfing destination because of the very high breaking waves that form due to the presence of the underwater Nazaré Canyon. The canyon increases and converges the incoming ocean swell which, in conjunction with the local water current, dramatically enlarges wave heights.

Due to the height of the waves, numerous surfing records have been set at Nazaré. In November 2011, surfer Garrett McNamara, who resided in Hawaii at that time, surfed a then record-breaking giant wave:  from trough to crest, at Praia do Norte, Nazaré. In October 2020, German surfer Sebastian Steudtner broke this record, riding a giant wave which was measured at  making it the largest ever surfed.

There has been a marked increase in visitors to popular viewing points for surfing competitions, such as the lighthouse at the Fort of São Miguel Arcanjo, which has seen numbers increase from 80,000 visitors in 2015 to 174,000 in 2017.

On January 5th, 2023, Brazilian professional surfer Márcio Freire died whilst practicing tow-in surfing.

International relations 

Nazaré is twinned with:
  Badajoz, Spain (since 1987)
  Nogent-sur-Marne, France (since 1993)
  Zushi, Japan (since 2004)

Notable people 

 Luis Soares (born 1964 in Nazaré) a long-distance runner, competed for France at the 1992 Summer Olympics
 Brothers Ricardo Esgaio (born 1993) & Tiago Esgaio (born 1995) Portuguese footballers
 Brothers Mauro Eustáquio (born 1993) & Stephen Eustáquio (born 1996) Canadian footballers

See also 
 Legend of Nazaré
 Sanctuary of Our Lady of Nazaré
 Nazaré Canyon
 Nazaré Funicular
 Praia do Norte (Nazaré)
 Fort of São Miguel Arcanjo

References

External links 

 

 
Big wave surfing
Centro Region
Seaside resorts in Portugal
Towns in Portugal
Municipalities of Leiria District
Municipalities of Portugal